Protoblepharus is a genus of skinks.

Species
The following 3 species are recognized as being valid.

Protoblepharus apatani 
Protoblepharus medogensis 
Protoblepharus nyingchiensis 

Nota bene: A binomial authority in parentheses indicates that the species was originally described in a genus other than Protoblepharus.

References

 
Lizard genera